Chitoria is a genus of butterflies in the family Nymphalidae found in Southeast Asia.

Species
Listed alphabetically (Funet):
 Chitoria chrysolora (Fruhstorfer, 1908)
 Chitoria cooperi (Tytler, 1926)
 Chitoria fasciola (Leech, 1890)
 Chitoria modesta  (Oberthür, 1906)
 Chitoria sordida (Moore, [1866])
 Chitoria subcaerulea (Leech, 1891)
 Chitoria ulupi (Doherty, 1889)
 Chitoria vietnamica Nguyen, 1979
Chitoria pallas  (Leech, 1890)
Chitoria leei  Lang，2009 Hubei Province, Mt. Shennongjia
Chitoria naga  (Tytler, 1915)  Yunnan

References

External links

Apaturinae
Nymphalidae genera
Taxa named by Frederic Moore